The Wolff-Jung Company Shoe Factory is a historic three-story building in Sheboygan, Wisconsin. It was designed in the Italianate style, and built in 1885 for businessmen Theodore Zscnetzsche, Jacob Jung, and Charles Wolff. It has been listed on the National Register of Historic Places since January 30, 1992.

References

1885 establishments in Wisconsin
Commercial buildings completed in 1885
Italianate architecture in Wisconsin
National Register of Historic Places in Sheboygan County, Wisconsin
Shoe factories